Mauro Valentini (born 27 July 1973) is a Sammarinese former footballer who played as a defender and made 23 appearances for the San Marino national team.

Career
Valentini was born in Viterbo, Italy.

Valentini made his international debut for San Marino on 5 June 1991 in a UEFA Euro 1992 qualifying match against Switzerland, which finished as a 0–7 away loss. He went on to make 23 appearances, scoring 1 goal, before making his last appearance on 31 March 1999 in a UEFA Euro 2000 qualifying match against Spain, which finished as a 0–6 home loss.

Career statistics

International

International goals

References

External links
 
 
 

1973 births
Living people
People from Viterbo
Footballers from Lazio
Sammarinese footballers
Italian people of Sammarinese descent
San Marino international footballers
Association football defenders
Rimini F.C. 1912 players
S.P. La Fiorita players
Serie C players
Serie D players
Eccellenza players
Sportspeople from the Province of Viterbo